Messier 77 or M77, also known as NGC 1068 and the Squid Galaxy, is a barred spiral galaxy about 47 million light-years away in the constellation Cetus. Messier 77 was discovered by Pierre Méchain in 1780, who originally described it as a nebula.  Méchain then communicated his discovery to Charles Messier, who subsequently listed the object in his catalog. Both Messier and William Herschel described this galaxy as a star cluster. Today, however, the object is known to be a galaxy.

The morphological classification of NGC 1068 in the De Vaucouleurs system is (R)SA(rs)b, where the '(R)' indicates an outer ring-like structure, 'SA' denotes a non-barred spiral, '(rs)' means a transitional inner ring/spiral structure, and 'b' says the spiral arms are moderately wound. Ann et al. (2015) gave it a class of SAa, suggesting tightly wound arms. However, infrared images of the inner part of the galaxy reveal a prominent bar not seen in visual light, and for this reason it is now considered a barred spiral.

Messier 77 is an active galaxy with an active galactic nucleus (AGN), which is obscured from view by astronomical dust at visible wavelengths. The diameter of the molecular disk and hot plasma associated with the obscuring material was first measured at radio wavelengths by the VLBA and VLA. The hot dust around the nucleus was subsequently measured in the mid-infrared by the MIDI instrument at the VLTI. It is the brightest and one of the closest and best-studied type 2 Seyfert galaxies, forming a prototype of this class.

X-ray source 1H 0244+001 in Cetus has been identified as Messier 77. Only one supernova has been detected in Messier 77. The supernova, named SN 2018ivc, was discovered on 24 November 2018 by the DLT40 Survey. It is a type II supernova, and at discovery it was 15th magnitude and brightening.

In February 2022 the European Southern Observatory found a cloud of cosmic dust at the centre of Messier 77 hiding a supermassive black hole.

In November 2022, the IceCube collaboration announced the detection of a neutrino source emitted by the active galactic nucleus of Messier 77. It is the second detection by IceCube after TXS 0506+056, and only the fourth known source including SN1987A and solar neutrinos.

See also
 List of Messier objects

References

External links

 
 "StarDate: M77 Fact Sheet"
 Spiral Galaxy M77 @ SEDS Messier pages
 VLBA image of the month: radio continuum and water masers of NGC 1068
 Press release about VLTI observations of NGC 1068
 ESO:Dazzling Spiral with an Active Heart incl. Potos & Animation
 
 

Barred spiral galaxies
Seyfert galaxies
Radio galaxies
Luminous infrared galaxies
Cetus (constellation)
077
NGC objects
02188
10266
041
Astronomical objects discovered in 1780